The 9th Empire Awards ceremony (officially known as the Sony Ericsson Empire Awards), presented by the British film magazine Empire, honored the best films of 2003 and took place on 4 February 2004 at The Dorchester Hotel in London, England. During the ceremony, Empire presented Empire Awards in nine categories as well as three honorary awards. The Lifetime Achievement Award was renamed to Career Achievement Award this year but was reverted to its former name at its next and last presentation. The ceremony was televised live in the United Kingdom by Sky Movies 1 with highlights and exclusive backstage interviews airing on Sky One Mix on 5 February. English actor Bill Bailey hosted the show for the first time. The awards were sponsored by Sony Ericsson for the second consecutive year.

Love Actually and The Lord of the Rings: The Return of the King were tied for most awards won with three awards apiece. Love Actually won the award for Best British Film, while The Lord of the Rings: The Return of the King won the award for Best Film. Other winners included Kill Bill: Volume 1 with two awards and Pirates of the Caribbean: The Curse of the Black Pearl with one. Ray Harryhausen received the Empire Inspiration Award, Sigourney Weaver received the Career Achievement Award and Roger Corman received the Independent Spirit Award.

Winners and nominees
Winners are listed first and highlighted in boldface.

Multiple awards
The following three films received multiple awards:

Multiple nominations
The following 11 films received multiple nominations:

References

External links
 
 

Empire Award ceremonies
2003 film awards
2004 in British cinema
2004 in London
February 2004 events in the United Kingdom
2000s in the City of Westminster